Toledo is an unincorporated community in Chase County, Kansas, United States.  It is located about 7 miles west of Emporia at the intersection of Yy Rd and 240 Rd (about 1 mile north of U.S. Route 50 highway).

History
A post office was opened in Toledo in 1858, and remained in operation until it was discontinued in 1903.

Education
The community is served by Chase County USD 284 public school district.  It has two schools.

References

Further reading

External links
 Chase County maps: Current, Historic, KDOT

Unincorporated communities in Chase County, Kansas
Unincorporated communities in Kansas